The Elms is a Grade II listed house  on Bright Street, North Wingfield, North East Derbyshire, England. It was built by the Clay family in 1720.

References

Grade II listed buildings in Derbyshire
Grade II listed houses
North East Derbyshire District